Surikov is a crater on Mercury. Its name was adopted by the International Astronomical Union (IAU) in 1979. Surikov is named for the Russian painter Vasily Surikov.

Surkiov is an ancient crater - the outer rim is barely distinguishable, but the inner peak ring is apparent.  It is one of 110 peak ring basins on Mercury.

To the south of Surikov is Giambologna crater.

References

Impact craters on Mercury